Raed Hamdan (born 7 January 1962) is a Saudi Arabian table tennis player. He competed in the men's singles event at the 1992 Summer Olympics.

References

1962 births
Living people
Saudi Arabian male table tennis players
Olympic table tennis players of Saudi Arabia
Table tennis players at the 1992 Summer Olympics
Place of birth missing (living people)